A Unit party is a union of two parties such as the National Movement Party and the Progressive Learning Party. Unit parties are established by big groups which are mostly in power before 1992. The leaders of the party are Shir Bazgar and Abdul Haq Holomi. The party's ideology and goals are Islamic. The party is supported and funded by large groups of Afghans residing in America, Europe, and Australia.

See also 

 Coalition government
 Popular front
 United front

Sources
https://web.archive.org/web/20090903135346/http://www.watan-afg.com/new_page_6.htm
http://www.mashal.org/content.php?c=payamha&id=00201

Political party alliances in Afghanistan